Richard Gray may refer to:

Sports
Richard Gray (footballer) (1877–?), association football goalkeeper
Richie Gray (rugby union, born 1989), Glasgow Warriors and Scottish rugby player
Richie Gray (rugby coach), Scottish rugby player, TV presenter and coach
Dick Gray (1931–2013), American professional baseball player
Dick Gray (ice hockey) (1920–1990), Canadian ice hockey player

Other
Richard Gray (director) (born 1980), Australian born screenwriter, film producer, and film director
Richard Gray (game designer) (born 1957), video game designer
Richard E. Gray (1945–1982), NASA test pilot
Rick Gray (Arizona politician), State Representative
Rick Gray (Pennsylvania politician), mayor of Lancaster, Pennsylvania

See also
Richard Grey (disambiguation)